Religious language may refer to:

Sacred language
Problem of religious language
:Category:Religious terminology